The Monterey County Jail is a jail in Salinas, California, United States. Built in 1931, it was listed on the National Register of Historic Places in 2004.

Cesar Chavez was imprisoned at the jail, raising national attention for the Salinas Valley lettuce boycott and affirming the legal use of boycotts as an organizing model.

References

External links

Buildings and structures in Salinas, California
History of labor relations in the United States
Jails in California
Jails on the National Register of Historic Places in California
National Register of Historic Places in Monterey County, California